There have been several sieges of Naples:

Siege of Naples (536) by the Byzantines
Siege of Naples (542–543) by the Ostrogoths
Siege of Naples (1078) by Prince Richard I of Capua
Siege of Naples (1191) by Henry VI, Holy Roman Emperor
Siege of Naples (1441) by Alfonso V of Aragon
Siege of Naples (1494) during the Italian War of 1494–1498
Siege of Naples (1528) by Louis, Count of Vaudémont